Chaenomeles cathayensis is a species of flowering plant in the rose family. It is native to China, Bhutan, and Myanmar.

This is a thorny deciduous shrub or tree growing up to 6 meters tall. The leaves are pointed, often toothed, and oval to lance-shaped. They are woolly-haired on the undersides, at least when new. The pink or white bell-shaped flowers are up to 4 centimeters wide. The fruit is a fragrant yellow-red pome 6 or 7 centimeters wide.

The plant is cultivated.

References

External links
 Chaenomeles cathayensis. Plants for a Future.

cathayensis
Flora of China
Flora of Bhutan
Flora of Myanmar
Plants described in 1900